Income Support is an income-related benefit in the United Kingdom for some people who are on a low income, but have a reason for not actively seeking work. Claimants of Income Support may be entitled to certain other benefits, for example, Housing Benefit, Council Tax Reduction, Child Benefit, Carer's Allowance, Child Tax Credit and help with health costs. A person with capital over £16,000 cannot get Income Support, and savings over £6,000 affect how much Income Support can be received. Claimants must be between 16 and Pension Credit age, work fewer than 16 hours a week, and have a reason why they are not actively seeking work (caring for a child under 5 years old or someone who receives a specified disability benefit).

Lone parents
Claimants can receive income support if they are a lone parent and responsible for a child under five who is a member of their household. A claimant is considered responsible for a child in any week if receiving child benefit for the child. However, if a claimant arranges for their child benefit to be paid to someone else, for example, an ex-partner, the claimant will still be treated as receiving the child benefit.

Studying 
If the claimant is at school or in higher education, the claimant may be able to get Income Support if they are:
 Looking after the claimant's own child
 An orphan and nobody is looking after the claimant
 Unlikely to be able to get a job because of a severe disability.
 Not living with the claimant's parents or being supported by them
 Not in touch with the claimant's parents
 Separated from the claimant's parents for reasons that cannot be avoided and nobody is looking after the claimant.

If the claimant is aged 18 to 24 and is attending an unwaged Work Based Learning Programme (England) or Skillseekers (Scotland) course, the claimant may be able to get Income Support.

If the claimant is aged 16 or 17, the claimant may get Income Support only if in one of the categories of persons who can get Income Support whilst studying.

Sickness 

On 27 October 2008, the Employment and Support Allowance replaced Income Support claimed on grounds of sickness or disability. Claims for Income Support made before that date were transferred to ESA.

Prior to this, claimants could be entitled to Income Support if they were unable to work due to sickness and had no or reduced entitlement to Incapacity Benefit. Normally, a claim for both benefits was made and the amount of Incapacity Benefit due was calculated according to the claimant's past National Insurance contributions. If too few contributions had been made for the full rate of Incapacity Benefit to be paid, Income Support may have been paid to top up the amount the claimant received to Income Support rates.

Parental Leave 

You may be able to get Income Support when on unpaid statutory parental leave if, when you were working, you were getting any of the following.  
 Working Tax Credit  
 Child Tax Credit
 Housing Benefit

Amount 
The weekly personal allowances for 2016/17 are shown in the table below.

Higher rates are set for eligible couples where either one of the couple is responsible for a child, or if each member of a couple is eligible for one of the following benefits if they weren't a couple:
 Employment and Support Allowance
 Income Support
 Jobseeker's Allowance

To this basic amount may be added amounts for qualifying claimants:
 carer premium
    disability premium
    enhanced disability premium
    severe disability premium
    pensioner premium
    family premium (obsolete - no new entitlements)
    family premium lone parent rate (obsolete - no new entitlements)
    disabled child premium (obsolete - no new entitlements)

Existing income from benefits or other sources may be taken into account and deducted from any Income Support entitlement awarded to a claimant.

Premiums

The carer premium applies if a person is entitled to Carer's allowance, even if they are not actually paid it because they receive another benefit. This premium is payable for each person who qualifies.

Disability premium  is applicable to people getting one of the following qualifying benefits:

   Attendance Allowance
   Disability Living Allowance 
   long-term Incapacity Benefit
   Severe Disablement Allowance
   the disability element or severe disability element of Working Tax Credit
   war pensioner's mobility supplement
   Constant Attendance Allowance
   Personal Independence Payment
   Armed Forces Independence Payment

Or if the claimant has been incapable of work or entitled to Statutory sick pay during the qualifying period of 52 weeks (or 28 weeks if you are terminally ill) and is still incapable of work, or is registered as blind, or taken off that register in the past 28 weeks.

Enhanced disability premium applies if the claimant or  partner is in the Employment and Support Allowance support group or is under the qualifying age for Pension Credit and receiving the higher rate care component of Disability Living Allowance, the Personal Independence Payment enhanced rate of the daily living component or Armed Forces Independence Payment.

There are limited circumstances when the pensioner premium would apply.  It is now  only paid when the claimant is above Pension Credit age and their partner has not yet reached that age, but they are unable to claim another benefit (e.g. if the claimant is currently receiving a Severe Disability Premium).  Since Pension Credit has features that make it more attractive than Income Support (in particular the way savings are treated) this is unlikely to occur frequently.

Severe disability premium applies if all of the following conditions are met:

 The claimant gets the care component of Disability Living Allowance (middle or higher rate), Attendance Allowance, the daily living component of the Personal Independence Payment or armed forces independence payment
 lives alone (there are exceptions to this rule)
 no one claims Carer's Allowance for looking after them

Mortgages 

For home-owners with a mortgage, Income Support may, depending on various qualifying conditions, help pay towards mortgage interest costs. There can be a waiting period of thirteen to thirty-nine weeks.

Older people

Claimants reaching the retirement age, and with an older partner who is that age, may apply for Pension Credit to replace their Income Support payments. They should contact The Pension Service four months before that time.

Appeal 
A refusal to grant Income Support may be appealed to the First-tier Tribunal. This should be done working one month of the date of any decision under dispute. If the appellant has good cause, this deadline can be extended a further 12 months (making a total of 13 months from the date of decision).

See also 
 Guaranteed minimum income
 Social Fund (UK)
 Supplemental Security Income, a similar programme offered by the United States Social Security Administration
 Welfare state

References

Further reading 
 Colombino, U. (2009). Evaluating alternative basic income mechanisms: a simulation for European countries, Discussion Papers 578, Research Department of Statistics Norway.

Social security in the United Kingdom